Paul Gerard Martin S.M. (born 5 May 1967) is a New Zealand prelate of the Roman Catholic Church, who has been serving as the coadjutor archbishop of Wellington since January 2021. From March 2018 until January 2021, he was the 10th Bishop of Christchurch, New Zealand and its Apostolic Administrator from January 2021 until May 2022.

Early life and education
Martin was born in Hastings, New Zealand. He is the son of Ronald and Carmel Martin, one of five children. He was educated at St Joseph's Primary School, Hastings, and undertook his secondary studies at St John's College.

Episcopacy

Bishop of Christchurch 
On 5 December 2017, Martin was appointed by Pope Francis to replace Barry Jones, the 9th bishop of Christchurch, who died on 13 February 2016. On 3 March 2018 he was consecrated as the 10th bishop of Christchurch, in a large gathering at Boy's High School Auditorium, Christchurch, by Cardinal John Dew, Archbishop of Wellington, bishop emeritus of Christchurch Basil Meeking and Charles Drennan of Palmerston North.

During his tenure as Bishop of Christchurch, the diocese saw  restructuring of parishes. Many parishes were combined to create five 'super' parishes in Christchurch, as well as combining all churches in the Selwyn and Waimakariri Districts in their own parish. 

One of the decisions he faced as Bishop of Christchurch was the future of the Cathedral of the Blessed Sacrament, after it was severely damaged in the 2010, February 2011 and June 2011 Canterbury earthquakes. His predecessor, Barry Jones had suggested that the nave of the cathedral could be saved. In August 2019, Martin made the decision to demolish the cathedral. By September 2020, the demolition work began. 

In December 2019, Martin made public plans for a new cathedral site, Catholic primary school, hotels, offices and a carpark, all in community and commercial collaboration with Ōtākaro Limited, and city developers, Carter Group.

Archbishop Coadjutor of the Archdiocese of Wellington 
On 1 January 2021, he was appointed coadjutor bishop of the Archdiocese of Wellington by Pope Francis.

References

External links
 
 

1967 births
People from Hastings, New Zealand
Living people
Pontifical University of Saint Thomas Aquinas alumni
21st-century Roman Catholic bishops in New Zealand
Roman Catholic bishops of Christchurch
People educated at St John's College, Hastings